Red Stitch Actors Theatre is an ensemble theatre company based in Melbourne, Australia.

Established in 2001 and with its first season in 2002, Red Stitch has presented over 100 contemporary plays. These include works from international playwrights such as Edward Albee, Annie Baker, Jez Butterworth, Martin Crimp, Amy Herzog, Sarah Kane, Neil LaBute and Simon Stephens, and more recently Australian playwrights such as Melissa Bubnic, Tom Holloway and Joanna Murray-Smith.

Red Stitch's 80-seat theatre is a converted church hall on Chapel Street, St Kilda East opposite the Astor Theatre. The company was based until 2003 in an industrial building in Inkerman Street, St Kilda.  Red Stitch occasionally plays seasons at Arts Centre Melbourne's Fairfax Studio and tours to other cities across Australia.

In 2019, Red Stitch revamped the Cromwell Road Theatre in South Yarra as a flexible space seating up to 120, to be a second venue for the company.

Red Stitch productions have won and been nominated for numerous Melbourne Green Room Awards, including receiving the 2006 Green Room Award for Production - Theatre Companies for Harvest by Richard Bean.  Its production of Red Sky Morning by Tom Holloway was nominated for the national Helpmann Award for Best Regional Touring Production in 2011.

References

Theatres in Melbourne
Theatre in Melbourne
Theatre companies in Australia
Organisations based in Melbourne
Buildings and structures in the City of Port Phillip
St Kilda East, Victoria